Skylink is a mobile LTE 450 MHz (formerly CDMA-450 MHz) operator in Russia.

History 
Moscow Cellular Communications - the oldest mobile operator in Moscow, in force since December 1991. Until 2005, the work was done in the analogue NMT-450 standard (and NMT-450i).

In 2003, in connection with the transition from analog cellular networks to digital company merged with other Russian operators NMT-450, to create a unified brand, called SkyLink.

As of May 2011, the operating company of "Sky Link", which offers services under this brand in Moscow and the Central Region of the country, is OJSC "Moscow Cellular Communications", St. Petersburg - JSC "Delta Telecom" [3] the oldest mobile phone operator in Russia, which has been working in the North-West region in 1991. [4]

22 December 2010 the management of "Sky Link" reported the launch of the GSM network in all regions for which the license was obtained, but in fact none of the subjects of the Russian Federation, a network of GSM and does not work.

2014 "Tele2 Russia" gained control of "SkyLink". The transaction was part of the merger of Rostelecom-Mobile assets.

25 May 2016 the management of "SkyLink" reported the launch of the LTE network in 4 regions in 450 MHz-spectrum.

External links

Skylink (RUS)

References

Telecommunications companies of Russia
Mobile phone companies of Russia
Companies based in Moscow
Russian brands